USS Gerald R. Ford (CVN-78) is the lead ship of her class of United States Navy aircraft carriers. The ship is named after the 38th President of the United States, Gerald Ford, whose World War II naval service included combat duty aboard the light aircraft carrier  in the Pacific Theater.

Construction began on 11 August 2005, when Northrop Grumman held a ceremonial steel cut for a 15-ton plate that forms part of a side shell unit of the carrier. The keel of Gerald R. Ford was laid down on 13 November 2009. She was christened on 9 November 2013. Gerald R. Ford entered the fleet replacing the decommissioned , which ended her 51 years of active service in December 2012. Originally scheduled for delivery in 2015, Gerald R. Ford was delivered to the Navy on 31 May 2017 and formally commissioned by President Donald Trump on 22 July 2017. Her first deployment departed October 4, 2022. , she is the world's largest aircraft carrier, and the largest warship ever constructed in terms of displacement.

Naming

In 2006, while Gerald Ford was still alive, Senator John Warner of Virginia proposed to amend a 2007 defense-spending bill to declare that CVN-78 "shall be named the USS Gerald Ford." The final version, signed by President George W. Bush on 17 October 2006, declared only that it "is the sense of Congress that ... CVN-78 should be named the U.S.S. Gerald R. Ford." Since such "sense of" language is typically non-binding and does not carry the force of law, the Navy was not required to name the ship after Ford.

On 3 January 2007, former United States Secretary of Defense Donald Rumsfeld announced that the aircraft carrier would be named after Ford during a eulogy for President Ford at Grace Episcopal Church in East Grand Rapids, Michigan. Rumsfeld indicated that he had personally told Ford of the honor during a visit to his home in Rancho Mirage a few weeks before Ford's death. This makes the aircraft carrier one of the few U.S. ships named after a living person. Later in the day, the Navy confirmed that the aircraft carrier would indeed be named after the former president. On 16 January 2007, Navy Secretary Donald Winter officially named CVN-78 USS Gerald R. Ford. Ford's daughter Susan Ford Bales was named the ship's sponsor. The announcements were made at a Pentagon ceremony attended by Vice President Dick Cheney, Senators Warner (R-VA) and Levin (D-MI), Major General Guy C. Swan III, Bales, Ford's other three children, and others.

The USS America Carrier Veterans Association (CVA) had pushed to name the ship USS America. The CVA is an association of sailors who served aboard . The carrier was decommissioned in 1996 and scuttled in 2005 in the Atlantic, as part of a damage test of large deck aircraft carriers.

History

Construction
On 10 September 2008, the U.S. Navy signed a $5.1 billion contract with Northrop Grumman Shipbuilding in Newport News, Virginia, to design and construct the carrier. Northrop had begun advance construction of the carrier under a $2.7 billion contract in 2005. The carrier was constructed at the Huntington Ingalls (formerly Northrop Grumman) Newport News Shipbuilding facilities in Newport News, Virginia, which employs 19,000 workers.

The keel of the new warship was ceremonially laid on 14 November 2009 in Dry Dock 12 by Ford's daughter, Susan Ford Bales. In a speech to the assembled shipworkers and DoD officials, Bales said: "Dad met the staggering challenges of restoring trust in the presidency and healing the nation's wounds after Watergate in the only way he knew how—with complete honesty and integrity. And that is the legacy we remember this morning."

The ship's crest was developed jointly by the ship sponsor and the first commanding officer, Captain John F. Meier.

In August 2011, the carrier was reported to be "structurally halfway complete". In April 2012, construction was said to be 75 percent complete. On 24 May 2012, the important milestone of completing the vessel up to the waterline was reached when the critical lower bow was lifted into place. This was the 390th of the nearly 500 lifts of the integral modular components from which the vessel is assembled. Huntington Ingalls reported in an 8 November press release construction had "reached 87 percent structural completion". By 19 December 2012, construction had reached 90 percent structural completion. "Of the nearly 500 total structural lifts needed to complete the ship, 446 have been accomplished."

The island was landed and accompanying ceremony took place on 26 January 2013.

On 7 May 2013, the last of 162 superlifts was put in place, bringing the ship to 100 percent structural completion.

On 11 July 2013, a time capsule was welded into a small room just above the floor, continuing a long Navy tradition. The time capsule holds items chosen by President Ford's daughter, Susan Ford Bales, and includes sandstone from the White House, Navy coins, and aviator wings from the ship's first commanding officer.

The ship was originally scheduled for launch in July 2013 and delivery in 2015. Production delays meant that the launch had to be delayed until 11 October 2013 and the naming ceremony until 9 November 2013, with delivery in February 2016.

On 3 October 2013, Gerald R. Ford had four 30-ton, -diameter bronze propellers installed. The installation of the propellers required more than 10 months of work to install the underwater shafting.

On 11 October 2013, the ship's drydock was flooded for the first time in order to test various seawater-based systems. Her launch date was set to be on the same day as her naming ceremony on 9 November 2013.

On 9 November 2013, the ship was christened by Ford's daughter, Susan Ford Bales, with a bottle of American sparkling wine.

As of 2013, construction costs were estimated at $12.8 billion, 22% over the 2008 budget, plus $4.7 billion in research and development costs. Because of budget difficulties, the Chief of Naval Operations, Admiral Jonathan Greenert, warned there might be a two-year delay beyond 2016 in completing Gerald R. Ford. The GAO reported that the price cap would be met by the Navy accepting an incomplete ship for that cost.

On 23 September 2015, the Navy announced that several weeks of testing delays would likely slip the delivery date into April or May 2016. In addition, construction was 93% complete as of September 2015.

In July 2016, a memo was obtained by CNN from Michael Gilmore, the US Department of Defense's Director of Operational Testing and Evaluation indicating that problems with four major flight systems would further delay combat readiness of the ship. The ship was not expected to be delivered until November 2016 and these issues were suggested to further delay that goal. Construction of the ship was described as 98% complete, with 88% of testing finished.

By March 2018, due to issues with the nuclear propulsion system and munitions elevators, construction costs had reached $13.027 billion, making the Gerald R. Ford the most expensive warship ever built. Planned delivery to the Navy was delayed by three months, to October 2019.

Newport News Shipbuilding has released a video documentary on the construction of Gerald R. Ford.

Performance improvements
Gerald R. Ford is intended to be the first of a class of aircraft carriers that offer significant performance improvements over the previous . Gerald R. Ford is equipped with an AN/SPY-3 and AN/SPY-4 active electronically scanned array multi-function, multi-band radar, and an island that is shorter in length and  taller than that of the Nimitz class; it is set  farther aft and  closer to the edge of the ship. Replacing traditional steam catapults, the Electromagnetic Aircraft Launch System (EMALS) will launch all non-VTOL carrier aircraft. This innovation eliminates the traditional requirement to generate and store steam, freeing up considerable area below-deck. With the EMALS, Gerald R. Ford can accomplish 25% more aircraft launches per day than the Nimitz class and requires 25% fewer crew members. The Navy estimates it will save $4 billion in operating costs over a 50-year lifespan. According to an Associated Press story:

These performance enhancements were problematic in Pentagon tests, but final software fixes for some of the problems were delayed until after the ship's post-shakedown availability in 2019.

Operational and major system testing
In January 2014, the annual Director, Operational Test and Evaluation (DOT&E) report recorded that critical ship systems in lab and test environments (including the EMALS, Advanced Arresting Gear (AAG), Dual Band Radar, and weapons elevators) were not reliable enough and needed more testing and improvements. The Navy implemented a rigorous testing program to ensure performance issues would be resolved before the systems were installed on the aircraft carrier. Major problems with the main turbine generators were found in June 2016. The fix, requiring design changes, was installed and was verified during acceptance trials in May 2017. The Initial Operational Test & Evaluation milestone was achieved in April 2017. On 8 April 2017, Gerald R. Ford got underway under her own power for the first time as she headed to sea for builder's trials. She completed the trials and returned to port at Naval Station Norfolk on 14 April 2017. On 24 May 2017, she departed for acceptance trials and completed them on 26 May 2017.

In 2018, the Navy requested to delay shock trials for at least six years in order to speed up the ship's deployment, but this request was denied. (18 tonnes) of TNT was detonated underwater, measured as a 3.9 magnitude earthquake by USGS. Additional tests were conducted in July and August, with the test detonations set off closer to the hull. The ship was determined to have passed the tests and this concluded the trials.

Delivery
On 31 May 2017, Newport News Shipbuilding delivered Gerald R. Ford to the U.S. Navy and her status was changed to Special, in service. Gerald R. Ford was formally commissioned into the United States Navy on 22 July 2017.

On 28 July 2017, Air Test and Evaluation Squadron 23 (VX-23) performed the first arrested landing and catapult launch from Gerald R. Ford in an F/A-18F Super Hornet.

According to a GAO report in mid-2020 the Gerald R. Ford was still reporting significant problems with the operation of her weapons elevators, while a DoD report in early 2021 stated that the ship was still not combat-ready, citing continuing problems with the Electromagnetic Aircraft Launch System (EMALS). Designed to achieve 4,166 aircraft launches between operational mission failures, instead it went 181 launches between failures, "well below the requirement".

On 20 March 2021, Gerald R. Ford and  conducted Ready for Operations (RFO) by the Italian Navy while transiting the Atlantic Ocean. In September 2022, Rear Adm. James Downey described the ship as "fully delivered" and has "met her initial operating capability".

Operational service
Gerald R. Ford left Naval Station Norfolk for her maiden deployment on 4 October 2022. The carrier was to conduct operations and training exercises alongside NATO allies and partners throughout the Atlantic Ocean.

Gerald R. Fords first port visit outside of her home country was on 28 October 2022, to Halifax Harbour in Nova Scotia, home of CFB Halifax, Canada's largest military installation and home port of the Royal Canadian Navy's Atlantic fleet. On 14 November 2022 the ship arrived in United Kingdom waters, for a four day visit anchored in Stokes Bay near Gosport.

See also 
 List of aircraft carriers
 List of aircraft carriers of the United States Navy

References

External links 

 
 DVIDS media website
 Builder's website
 Nimitz Class vs. Ford Class, Captain John F. Meier (video, 2m7s)
OSD Operational Testing and Evaluation Annual Reports re CVN78;
 FY2013 (January 2014)
 FY2014 (January 2015) 
 FY2015 (January 2016) 
 FY2016 (December 2016) 
 FY2017 (January 2018)

 

Gerald R. Ford-class aircraft carriers
Nuclear ships of the United States Navy
Ships built in Newport News, Virginia
2013 ships